Eupithecia pindosata is a moth in the family Geometridae. It is found in Greece.

References

Moths described in 2008
pindosata
Moths of Europe